State Route 671 (SR 671) is a state highway in Washoe County, Nevada. It runs along Holcomb Lane and portions of Lakeside Drive and Huffaker Lane in an agricultural area of southern Reno.

Route description

State Route 671 begins at the intersection of South Virginia Street (U.S. Route 395 Alternate and U.S. Route 395 Business) and Holcomb Lane. From there, the route travels westward along Holcomb Lane (also called Holcomb Ranch Lane) as it passes through farmlike residential areas. SR 671 passes through similar surroundings as it follows Lakeside Drive north. The route reaches an intersection with Huffaker Drive after , where it turns east.

History
The route was originally designated on April 27, 1983. At that time, SR 671 continued east on Huffaker Lane to pass under Interstate 580 and U.S. Route 395 and end at the intersection of Huffaker Lane and South Virginia Street. The route was truncated to its current length by January 2008.

Major intersections

See also

References

671
Transportation in Washoe County, Nevada